Gillian Carleton (born 3 December 1989) is a Canadian road and track cyclist. Carleton won the bronze medal at the 2012 London Olympics in the women's team pursuit. In preparation for the Olympics they finished second in the team pursuit at the Track Cycling World Cup in London in February 2012.

Major results
2013
1st Team Pursuit, Los Angeles Grand Prix (with Allison Beveridge, Laura Brown, Jasmin Glaesser and Stephanie Roorda)
2014
1st  Omnium, Pan American Track Championships
Fastest Man on Wheels
1st Points Race
2nd Scratch Race
2nd Omnium, Cottbuser Nächte
2nd Omnium, Sprintermeeting

See also
 2013 Specialized–lululemon season

References

External links

1989 births
Living people
Canadian female cyclists
Canadian track cyclists
Cyclists at the 2012 Summer Olympics
Olympic cyclists of Canada
Olympic medalists in cycling
Olympic bronze medalists for Canada
Medalists at the 2012 Summer Olympics
Sportspeople from Scarborough, Toronto